Asa Walton Farr (February 28, 1821October 6, 1863) was an American lawyer, politician, and Wisconsin pioneer.  He was a member of the Wisconsin State Assembly for one term, representing Walworth County.  He served as a Union Army quartermaster officer during the American Civil War and was murdered by Confederate guerillas in the massacre at Baxter Springs.

Biography
Asa Farr was born in Sharon, Vermont, in February 1821.  He was raised and educated in New England and came to Wisconsin with his wife and children in the early 1850s.  He was admitted to the Wisconsin bar in 1853 and he formed a legal partnership with Charles Minton Baker.

Farr was elected to the Wisconsin State Assembly in 1855 and served in the 9th Wisconsin Legislature.

At the outbreak of the American Civil War, Farr volunteered for service in the Union Army and was enrolled as an assistant quartermaster in the 3rd Wisconsin Cavalry Regiment.  The 3rd Wisconsin Cavalry was involved in anti-guerilla operations in the Trans-Mississippi theater of the war, especially around the Kansas–Missouri border area.

In October 1863, Farr was attached to the escort of General James G. Blunt near Fort Baxter, in Cherokee County, Kansas, when they came under attack from several hundred Confederate guerillas, led by William Quantrill.  The Union caravan was overrun and many wounded and captured Union soldiers were murdered, including Farr, in what was referred to as the massacre at Baxter Springs.

Personal life and family
Asa Farr married Elisabeth Hadley on May 13, 1845, in Massachusetts.  They had at least two children.

References

External links
 

1821 births
1863 deaths
People from Windsor County, Vermont
People from Lake Geneva, Wisconsin
Union Army officers
People of Wisconsin in the American Civil War
United States politicians killed during the Civil War
Democratic Party members of the Wisconsin State Assembly